Berliner Tor (literally "Berlin Gate") is a transport hub in Hamburg, Germany, served by the Hamburg U-Bahn (underground railway) and the Hamburg S-Bahn (suburban railway). The station is located in St. Georg, part of the borough of Hamburg-Mitte.

The railway station is listed by the German railway company, because S-Bahn call at this station, and the S-Bahn part of it is managed by DB Station&Service.

History 

Berliner Tor S-Bahn station opened in 1906.

The original Berliner Tor U-Bahn station was designed by the architect, Erich Elingius, and built between 1908 and 1910, opening on 1 March 1912. It had a brick wall on the North, and some glass walls on the South.

During the British Operation Gomorrah (air raids) in 1943, the damage to the station was so severe that the U-Bahn was no longer able to serve the line. On 19 January 1948, the station re-opened as a terminus for trains to Barmbek via Schlump, and from 1 July 1949, trains continued again to Mundsburg.

From 1962 to 1964, a new station complex was built to the North of the old one, and it opened on 10 May 1964, after which the old building was demolished. Between 1964 and 1966, the station was expanded from two platforms to four. From 2 January 1967, the U3 served the station, and between September 1968 and June 1973, the U21.

Services 
Berliner Tor is a station for the rapid transit trains of the lines S1, S11, S2 and S21 of the Hamburg S-Bahn and the lines U2 and U3 of the Hamburg U-Bahn. In front of the railway station exits, there are various bus stops.

The Hamburg U-Bahn opened the line U4 in 2012.

See also 
 Hamburger Verkehrsverbund (HVV)
 List of Hamburg U-Bahn stations
 List of Hamburg S-Bahn stations

References

External links 

 DB station information 

Hamburg S-Bahn stations in Hamburg
Hamburg U-Bahn stations in Hamburg
U2 (Hamburg U-Bahn) stations
U3 (Hamburg U-Bahn) stations
U4 (Hamburg U-Bahn) stations
Railway stations in Germany opened in 1906
Buildings and structures in Hamburg-Mitte